Anderson's four-eyed opossum (Philander andersoni) is an opossum species from South America. It is found in Brazil, Colombia, Ecuador, Peru and Venezuela. Its dorsal fur is dark, with a black stripe, about 3–4 cm wide, going vertically down the midline of its back. Its dorsal fur is short, about 10 mm long. Its ventral fur is dark gray, but still distinctly lighter than the sides and dorsum. Its tail is furred for the first (approximately) 18% of its length, going from the base to the tip.
Its species name "andersoni" was chosen to honor American scientific collector Malcolm Playfair Anderson.

References

Natureserve.org

Opossums
Marsupials of South America
Mammals of Brazil
Mammals of Colombia
Mammals of Ecuador
Mammals of Peru
Mammals of Venezuela
Mammals described in 1913